Silent Nights is a Danish short film directed by Aske Bang. It was nominated for the Academy Award for Best Live Action Short Film at the 89th Academy Awards in 2017, that he shared with Kim Magnusson.

Premise
A Danish volunteer at a housing shelter falls for an illegal immigrant.

Cast
Malene Beltoft as Inger 
Prince Yaw Appiah as Kwame

Awards
 Nominated: Academy Award for Best Live Action Short Film - Silent Nights

References

External links
 

2016 films
Films shot in Denmark
Films set in Denmark
Films set in 2015
Films set in 2016
Films about immigration
Films about racism
Films about homelessness
Danish-language films
Danish drama films
2016 short films
2016 drama films
2010s English-language films